Marvcus Raymond Patton (born May 1, 1967) is a former professional American football player who was selected by the Buffalo Bills in the 8th round of the 1990 NFL Draft. A 6'2", 239-lb. linebacker from UCLA, Patton played in 13 NFL seasons from 1990 to 2002 for the Bills, the Washington Redskins, and the Kansas City Chiefs.  Patton never missed a regular season game in his entire career. After earning a full-time starting role in his fourth season with the Bills, he started all but three games for the remainder of his career.

Early life
Patton was just 9-years-old when his father Raymond Hicks, an undercover detective in Los Angeles, was shot and killed in the line of duty. His mother, Barbara Patton, a former National Women's Football League player with the Los Angeles Dandelions, taught Patton about football. Mother and son both played middle linebacker, with Barbara once breaking an opposing player's helmet.  “I thought it was really cool to tell my friends that my mom was a linebacker,” Patton once shared.

Football career
Earning an academic scholarship, Patton was a walk-on at UCLA.  Typically, students without an athletic scholarship are lucky to have a place on special teams.  However, the astute Patton was a starter his senior year, gaining All-America honorable mention, and also was a three-time Pac-10 All-Academic honorable mention while earning a political science degree with academic honors.

As a rookie in 1990, Patton was injured on the opening kickoff in the Bills 1990 playoff opener against the Miami Dolphins with a lower leg injury. He did not play in either of the Bills final two playoff games, but went on to play in every regular season game for the rest of his career.

Personal life
Currently, Patton resides in the Washington D.C. area with his wife, Dr. Ina Patton, their two children, and their dog, Jack.  Marvcus is a restaurateur and owns sports-themed restaurants in Northern Virginia, one of which is Lucky's Sports Theatre and Grill in Springfield, Virginia. Patton and his wife also created a children's apparel and book company, Girls Like Math, that promotes positive images for girls and challenges gender stereotypes with fun, hip clothing and entertaining books and games.

References

External links
Marvcus Patton interview with Michael T. Brown on Blog Talk Radio (October 19, 2013).

1967 births
Living people
Buffalo Bills players
Washington Redskins players
Kansas City Chiefs players
UCLA Bruins football players
University of California, Los Angeles alumni